Penica is a genus of moths in the family Gracillariidae.

Species
Penica peritheta Walsingham, 1914

External links
Global Taxonomic Database of Gracillariidae (Lepidoptera)

Gracillariinae
Gracillarioidea genera